Fredrik Wilhelm von Otter (11 April 1833 – 9 March 1910) was a Swedish friherre, naval officer and politician, most notably serving as Prime Minister of Sweden from 1900 to 1902.

Life and work 
Otter was born on the Fimmersta estate (Töreboda Municipality) in Västergötland and belonged to the wealthy and aristocratic von Otter family. He entered the Royal Swedish Navy as second lieutenant at the age of 17, but remained without promotion for a long time. Meanwhile, he served in the British Royal Navy from 1857 to 1861, participating in campaigns against pirates in the South China Sea, and took part in one of Adolf Erik Nordenskiöld's North Pole expeditions in 1868, as commander of the expedition ship Sofia. He was promoted to commander and made aide-de-camp of Crown Prince Oscar, the Duke of Östergötland, in 1872 and remained so after the prince's accession to the throne as Oscar II in 1873.

In 1874 he was promoted to captain and appointed Ministry for Naval Affairs in the cabinet, succeeding Major General Baron Abraham Leijonhufvud. He remained in this position until the resignation of the De Geer cabinet in 1880, after which he was appointed director of the naval shipyard in Karlskrona. He was made a Commodore in 1884, a vice admiral in 1892 and admiral in 1900. 

He also represented Blekinge County  in the parliamentary First Chamber 1891–1899, and Karlskrona in the Second Chamber 1900–1902.

After the resignation of Erik Gustaf Boström in 1900, Otter was offered the premiership by the king and formed a cabinet which would remain in office for two years. As Prime Minister he was responsible for carrying through the remodelling of the military system and the final abolition of the allotment system introduced by Charles XI more than 200 years earlier. In connection with the new military organization, a progressive taxation system was introduced. After the end of that parliamentary session in July 1902, Otter resigned and was succeeded by his predecessor Boström. The main reason for his resignation was the failure in the Riksdag of a proposed bill on voting rights. He spent his remaining years managing his estate at Trantorp outside Karlskrona.

References

1833 births
1910 deaths
People from Töreboda Municipality
Members of the Första kammaren
Prime Ministers of Sweden
Swedish Navy admirals
Swedish nobility
Members of the Andra kammaren
Commanders Grand Cross of the Order of the Sword
Barons of Sweden
19th-century Swedish politicians
20th-century Swedish politicians